The St. Norbert Green Knights softball team represents St. Norbert College in NCAA Division III college softball.  The team participates in the Midwest Conference. The Green Knights are currently led by head coach JoAnn Krueger. The team plays its home games at Mel Nicks Field located on the college's campus.

History

Year-by-year results

References

External links